The 1976 Alan King Tennis Classic was a men's tennis tournament played on outdoor hard courts at the Caesars Palace in Las Vegas, Nevada in the United States that was sanctioned by the ATP but not part of the Grand Prix or World Championship Tennis circuits. It was the fifth edition of the tournament held from May 10 through 16, 1976. First-seeded Jimmy Connors won the singles title for the first time and earned $30,000 first-prize money as well as a new car.

Finals

Singles

 Jimmy Connors defeated  Ken Rosewall 6–1, 6–3
 It was Connors' 6th singles title of the year, and the 47th of his career.

Doubles

 Arthur Ashe /  Charlie Pasarell defeated  Bob Lutz /  Stan Smith 6–4, 6–2

References

External links
 ITF – tournament edition details

 
Alan King Tennis Classic
Alan King Tennis Classic
Tennis in Las Vegas